Sir Richard Julian Long,  (born 2 June 1945) is an English sculptor and one of the best-known British land artists.

Long is the only artist to have been short-listed four times for the Turner Prize. He was nominated in 1984, 1987 and 1988, and then won the award in 1989 for White Water Line. He lives and works in Bristol, the city in which he was born.

Long studied at Saint Martin's School of Art before going on to create work using various media including sculpture, photography and text. His work is on permanent display in Britain at the Tate and Bristol City Museum and Art Gallery as well as galleries in America, Switzerland and Australia.

Long's work has broadened the idea of sculpture to be a part of performance art and conceptual art. His work typically is made of earth, rock, mud, stone and other nature based materials. In exhibitions his work is typically displayed with the materials or through documentary photographs of his performances and experiences.

Early life and education

Long was born in Bristol, in south-west England. Between 1962 and 1965 he studied at the West of England College of Art, and then, from 1966 to 1968, at Saint Martin's School of Art in London, where he studied under Anthony Caro and Phillip King and became closely associated with fellow student Hamish Fulton.

Work
Several of his works were based around walks that he has made, and as well as land based natural sculpture, he uses the mediums of photography, text and maps of the landscape he has walked over. Long has been taking these walks since the mid 1960s where he has walked in places such as the Sahara Desert, Australia, Iceland and near his home in Bristol, United Kingdom. His work has proven to be revolutionary as it has changed how society views sculpture. His work has influenced the boundaries of sculpture to not be limited to only "traditional" materials and to be able to use alternative materials in his work. Not only is he using alternative materials such as rock and earth, but he also changed what art is, as the actual art piece can be the process of creating the art itself.

In his work, often cited as a response to the environments he walked in, the landscape would be deliberately changed in some way, as in A Line Made by Walking (1967), and sometimes sculptures were made in the landscape from rocks or similar found materials and then photographed. Other pieces consist of photographs or maps of unaltered landscapes accompanied by texts detailing the location and time of the walk it indicates.

His piece Delabole Slate Circle, acquired from the Tate Modern in 1997, is a central piece in Bristol City Museum and Art Gallery. The piece is nearly 2 metres in diameter and is composed of 168 pieces of slate that came from the Delabole quarry in Cornwall, United Kingdom. The piece can be configured differently, however Long has specified a few rules on how it should be put together. All pieces of stone must touch so that they can be locked together and stable, as well as the pieces must form a circle. The connection of the slates and the geometric shape illustrates a common theme that Long portrays in his work about the relationship between man and nature. Long explains, "you could say that my work is ... a balance between the patterns of nature and formalism of human, abstract ideas of lines and circles. It is where my human characteristics meet the natural forces and patterns of the world, and that is really the kind of subject of my work."

At Houghton Hall in Norfolk, the Marquess of Cholmondeley commissioned a sculpture to the east of the house.  Long's land art there consists of a circle of Cornish slate at the end of a path mown through the grass.

Permanent installations include Riverlines (2006) at the Hearst Tower in New York, US (at about 35 x 50 feet (11 x 15 metres) this was at the time the biggest wall work he had ever made); Planet Circle (1991) at the Museum de Pont, Tilburg, Netherlands; and White Water Falls (2012) in the Garvan Institute in Sydney, Australia.

In 2009, a retrospective of Long's work entitled "Heaven and Earth," appeared at the Tate Britain. In 2015, a major solo exhibition Richard Long: Time and Space, at the Arnolfini, celebrated his work in his hometown of Bristol.

Walked-line pieces
Long has created several pieces which hearken back to the original 1967 piece A Line Made by Walking. Some are circles or organic paths. Some exist in snow, dust, and even charred grass.

Books
Nile (Papers of River Muds). Los Angeles: Lapis Press, 1990. 
South America. Brest: Zédélé éditions, 2012. (Düsseldorf: Konrad Fischer, 1972 [1st ed.]).
Clarrie Wallis' 2009 book, Richard Long: Heaven and Earth was published as a companion to an exhibit of his photographs at the Tate Gallery, London.

Selected honours and awards

 1976 Represented Britain in the British Pavilion at the Venice Biennale, Venice, Italy
 1989 Turner Prize, Tate Gallery, London, UK
 1990 Chevalier de l’Ordre des Arts et des Lettres, French Ministry of Culture, Paris, France
 2001 Elected to the Royal Academy of Arts
 2009 Awarded the Praemium Imperiale for sculpture from Japan
 2015 Named Whitechapel Gallery Art Icon
 2023 Wolf Prize in Arts

Long was appointed a Commander of the Order of the British Empire (CBE) in the 2013 New Year Honours and a Knight Bachelor in the 2018 New Year Honours for services to art.

Art market
Long's Whitechapel Slate Circle (1981) brought a record price for the artist in 1989 when it sold for $209,000 at Sotheby's in New York. At another auction in 1992, the piece was estimated far more modestly at $120,000 to $160,000, but bidding never exceeded $110,000; instead, the National Gallery of Art, Washington, D.C. purchased it in 1994 through dealer Anthony d'Offay.

See also
 Land art
 Environmental art
 Environmental sculpture

Notes

References
 Roelstraete, Dieter. Richard Long: A Line Made by Walking. London: Afterall Books, 2010.
 Gayford, Martin. "In the studio: Richard Long," Daily Telegraph (London). 4 April 2006.
 Gooding, Mel and William Furlong. (2002). Artists, Land, Nature.  New York: Abrams. 
 Long Richard, Mirage, edition Phaidon, 1998, 
 Tafalla, Marta. "From Allen Carlson to Richard Long: The Art-Based Appreciation of Nature", in: Alessandro Bertinetto, Fabian Dorsch, Cain Todd (eds.). Proceedings of the European Society for Aesthetics, vol. 2, pp 491–515, 2010.
 Miller, Juliet. On the Track of Richard Long''. Norwich: "Smokehouse Press", 2014.

External links

Long, official website
Houghton Hall, photo of land art installation
Sperone Westwater Gallery

1945 births
20th-century English painters
English male painters
21st-century English painters
Photographers from Bristol
English sculptors
English male sculptors
Commanders of the Order of the British Empire
Knights Bachelor
English contemporary artists
British conceptual artists
Land artists
Artists from Bristol
Turner Prize winners
Royal Academicians
English installation artists
Alumni of the University of the West of England, Bristol
Living people
Alumni of Camberwell College of Arts
Alumni of Saint Martin's School of Art
20th-century British sculptors
Walking artists